Blue Horizon is a 2003 novel by Wilbur Smith.

Adaptation
Film and TV rights to the book were bought by Corona Pictures but as of 2013 no adaptation has been filmed.

References

External links
Review at Publishers Weekly

Novels by Wilbur Smith
2003 British novels
Macmillan Publishers books